Line Hagman (born 1983) is a Norwegian orienteering competitor, born in Oppegård. At the 2003 Junior World Orienteering Championships in Põlva she placed fifth in the long distance and won a bronze medal in the relay with the Norwegian team. She competed at the 2004 World Orienteering Championships in Västerås, where she placed 10th in the sprint. At the 2007 World Orienteering Championships in Kyiv she competed in the middle distance, placing 31st. She also competed at the 2010 World Orienteering Championships, where she placed 12th in the middle distance.

References

External links
 
 Line Hagman at World of O Runners

1983 births
Living people
People from Oppegård
Norwegian orienteers
Female orienteers
Foot orienteers
Sportspeople from Viken (county)
21st-century Norwegian women
Junior World Orienteering Championships medalists